Kicaster Creek is a short stream in Wilson County, Texas.  The creek begins in the recharge zone for the Carrizo-Wilcox Aquifer, near Kicaster, six miles southwest of the town of La Vernia. It flows through the Sand Hills Region of Wilson County for eleven miles southeastward to its mouth three miles northwest of the town of Floresville on the San Antonio River.

References

See also
List of rivers of Texas

Rivers of Texas
Rivers of Wilson County, Texas